There are at least 50 named mountain ranges in the U.S. state of Oregon.  Many of these ranges extend into the neighboring states of California, Idaho, Nevada, and Washington.  Elevations and coordinates are from the U.S. Geological Survey, Geographic Names Information System, unless otherwise indicated.

See also 
 List of mountains of Oregon
 Lists of Oregon-related topics
 List of mountain ranges of California
 List of mountain ranges of Nevada

Notes

 
Oregon, List of mountain ranges of
 
Mountain